Renato Ongari (July 1, 1935 – October 12, 2016) was an Italian sprint canoer who competed in the early 1960s. At the 1960 Summer Olympics in Rome, he was eliminated in the semifinals of the K-1 4 × 500 m event.

References
Renato Ongari's profile at Sports Reference.com
Renato Ongari's obituary 

1935 births
2016 deaths
Canoeists at the 1960 Summer Olympics
Italian male canoeists
Olympic canoeists of Italy
20th-century Italian people